Christos Davelis (real name: Christos Natsios, circa 1832 – 12 July 1856) was an infamous Greek brigand of Arvanite-Vlach descent, operating in the regions of Attica and Boeotia.

Biography 
According to an older account, Christos Natsios was born in Steiri, Boeotia in 1832 to a shepherd Arvanite-Vlach family. A newer opinion assumes descent from Arachova, while other writers point to Styra in Euboea.

For a period of time, he had been a shepherd for the flocks of the Monastery of Daou Penteli, whose milk he sold in Athens (a secondary account states he worked at Petraki monastery instead, in Kolonaki). At some point, the abbot of the Monastery gave him a letter to deliver to a nun in the city, making Natsios curious and taking it to someone who would read it for him. Learning of its content, he met with the nun himself and became a frequent visitor. The abbot eventually learned of this, and in anger reported Natsios to the authorities on theft charges. Due to the unjust sentence, Natsios was punished via bastinado, then left for Styra. While in Styra, he fell in love with a priest's daughter, who was already betrothed to a wealthy shepherd. When an army unit arrived in the village searching for a deserter named Nastos, the shepherd pointed to Davelis as revenge. Not managing to convince the officers that he was not the deserter in question, a fight broke out when an arrest attempt was made, killing a gendarme and escaping.

After this incident, he took refuge in the mountainside, in the gang of his mother's cousin, the famed brigand Kakarapis (real name Belulias). In due time, he took up on the nickname Davelis, created his own gang, robbing travellers, peasants and shepherds.

At one time, the Italian duchess Luisa Bacoli, who had requested the gang's protection to safely visit Delphi, fell in love with Davelis. At the same time, Davelis' second-in-command, Ioannis Megas, who had also fallen in love with the duchess, became hostile to Davelis and defected to the Gendarmerie, becoming an officer.

Davelis' brigandage was not seen as anything special for its time, excluding an incident which was heard around Greece and lauded as an act of resistance against foreign interventionism. In 1855, during the Crimean War, with the isolation of Athens by the British and French fleets as well as the occupation of the port of Piraeus to force the country to not join the war on the side of Russia, Davelis kidnapped French officer Berteau (or Breteau) in Peiraios Street. As ransom, Davelis was given 30 thousand drachma in gold by the Greek government for the officer's release, an astronomical amount of money at the time. The ransom was provided as quickly as possible to both avoid foreign intervention in Greek internal affairs as well as cover up the connection between brigands and politicians of the time.

Davelis is a prominent figure in folklore, with numerous legends surrounding him. One claims he would regularly go down to Athens in disguise, casually conversing with coffee shop patrons unaware of his true identity. A well-known local tradition states that from his lair in the Cave of the Immaculate, he would arrive at the manor of the Duchess of plaisance, Sophie de Marbois-Lebrun, and have intimate times with her. This tradition is most likely baseless, since all evidence points to Davelis returning to Mount Penteli (where both the cave and the manor were) just after the Duchess' death.

In spring 1856, his brigandry on the northern outskirts of Athens reached an all-time peak. In May, he ambushed the gendarmes stationed in the town of Menidi, forcing them to lay down their arms. After this humiliating encounter, a manhunt was unleashed, hunting the brigand all the way to Mount Parnassus in the region of Fokida. At the same time, the letter correspondence between Davelis and Bacoli, who was arranging safe passage for him and his gang in Italy, was intercepted by the Gendarmerie, depriving the bandits of the element of surprise. Eventually, a large Gendarmerie force surrounded the brigands near the village of Zemeno in Boeotia.

In the ensuing battle, Davelis offered his former right-hand man, Megas, who was present, a duel to the death. Megas attempted to behead Davelis with his firearm's bayonet, however he was fatally shot by Davelis before he himself was stabbed by another gendarme. Traditionally, he is said to have shouted "Neither shall Davelis be in the mountains, nor shall Megas be in the palace." His head was retrieved and displayed in plain view in Syntagma Square in Athens for many days, impaled on a pike.

Bibliography

References

1832 births
1856 deaths